Pater Sparrow (born Zoltán Verebes in 1978, in Budapest) is a Hungarian filmmaker and production designer. He graduated from London Film School as a director with a production designer distinction. He is the son of Hungarian actor/director/media personality István Verebes and grandson of actor Károly Verebes.

Starting as an amateur filmmaker,  Sparrow made his first two short films (Without With 1998, The Something 1999,)  which were nominated both year in competition in the biggest film festival in Hungary.

Since being intertested in the boundaries of conventional filmmaking he applied  to the very pragmatic London Film School.  While studying in London he had made two short films Sense (2001) Limit (2002) and worked in several film projects as a production designer. He graduated as a MA director and production designer with his diploma film called T?ick (2004) and wrote dissertation in the topic of non-narrative film theories. After living and studying in the United Kingdom, he returned to his hometown, Budapest where he started developing on his first feature film based on a Stanislaw Lem essay, with the help of his former mentor Zoltan Kamondi's company Honeymood Films.  Meanwhile, he was making several experimental films and visual projects like RECYCLEd – Pro – Reo – Neo (2006) which also attracted attention to him.

His first feature film 1 (2009) reached a big success for a debut film in Hungary, and also collected awards abroad.

He is primarily interested in unique experimental style of mystic and surreal elements in shifted space and time with visual allegories and codes. He considers himself a filmmaker who approaches filmmaking as a visual communication in the face of storytelling.

During the years he had experienced working in different fields of professional film and television crews, such as assistant for director Zoltán Kamondi in The Alchemist And The Virgin (1999) assistant production designer for Academy Award winner Luciana Arigghi in Being Julia (2004) art director for Kevin Phipps production designer (Eyes Wide Shut, Fifth Element, Dune, Slipstream, etc.)in a Cadbury commercial which was directed by Brian Buckley, or production designer of Pater Strickland's third feature film The Duke Of Burgundy (2014).

In 2015 he made the production design on several Hungarian feature films such as 'My Night Is Your Day / Éjszakám a nappalod (2015), Well / Kút (2015), Troupers / Vándorszínészek (2015), in 2016 Budapest Noir (2016), in 2017 Swoon (2018), and in 2018 BUÉK (2018).

He is currently developing his second feature film based on Boris Vian's Heartsnatcher, and working freelance in Hungary.

Director filmography
Patience that Blossoms into Death – (2014)
aurA – (2011)
1 – (2008)
Recycled / Pro-Reo-Neo – (2006)
T?ick – (2003)
Limit – (2002)
Sense – (2001)
The Girls Are Angels – (2000)
Frozen – (1999)
The Something – (1999)
Without With – (1998)
I&I – (1996)

Production designer filmography
Semmelweis (2022/director: Lajos Koltai - production designer
Cicaverzum (2022/director: Rozalia Szeleczki - production designer
Wintergarden (2022/director: Brigitta Bacskai - production designer
Get Lost (2021/director: Daniela Amavia) - production designer
Soulpark (2021/director: Illés Horváth, Róbert Odegnál) - production designer
Hyundai (2020/director: Felipe Ascacibar) - production designer
TKMaxx (2019/director: Sam Hibbard) - production designer
Zalando (2019/director: Sam Hibbard) - production designer
Toxikoma (2019/director: Gábor Herendi) - production designer 
Bag (2019/director: Flurin Giger) - production designer
Kia (2019/director: Daniel Azancot) - production designer
Viabuy (2018/director: Toon Aerts) - production designer
Xbox & Tacobell (2018/director: Dave Laden) - production designer
Ferrero Rocher (2018/director: Marat Adelshin) - production designer
Betano (2018/director: Peter Dietrich) - production designer
Müller Bianco (2018/director: Karina Taira) - production designer
Müller Frutta (2018/director: Karina Taira) - production designer
Buék (2018/director: Kriszta Goda) – production designer
Swoon (2018/directors: Måns Mårlind, Björn Stein) – production designer
The Field Guide to Evil (2018/director: Peter Strickland) – section – production designer
Neoton Familia feat. Jappan & Barnsz / Holnap Hajnalig (2016/director: Miki357)– production designer 
Ivan & The Parazol / F.É.SZ.E.K. (2016/director: Damokos Attila) – production designer
Budapest Noir (2016/director: Éva Gárdos) – production designer
Troupers (2015/director: Pál Sándor) – production designer
Well (2015/director: Attila Gigor) – production designer
Lavazza (2015/director: Jean-Pierre Jeunet) – art director
Milton (2014/director: Vivek Kakkad) – production designer
Vat69 (2014/director: Renny Maslow) – production designer
My Night Is Your Day (2014/directors: András Dési, Gábor Móray) – production designer
National Opera House Budapest Id (2014/directors: Tamás Gács, Danila Kostil) – production designer
Beautyqueen (2014/director: Oláh Judit) - production designer
The Duke Of Burgundy (2013/director: Peter Strickland) – production designer
Cadbury Eclair / The Writer (2013/director: Bryan Buckley) – art director
National Opera House Budapest Id (2013/director: Tamás Gács) – production designer
East Of Paris (2012/director: Orsi Nagypál) – production designer
Pinguin Construction (2012/director: Mihály Schwechtje) – production designer
Useless Stuff (2012/director: Áron Mátyássy) – production designer
PlayStation Vita / Gravity Daze (2012/director: Masaya Yamamoto) – production designer 
Moss And Lichen (2012/director: Vandad Kashefi) – production designer
Cruse 2. (2011/director: Áron Mátyássy) – art director
Idol (2011/director: Geir Hornes) – production designer
Big Brother (2011/director: Geir Hornes) – production designer
Skai Vi Danse (2011/director: Geir Hornes) – production designer
aurA (2011) – production designer
Please sir! (2010/director: Áron Mátyássy) – production designer
Enter (2010) – production designer
1 (2008) – production designer
Recycled/Pro-Reo-Neo (2006) – art director
That's Life (2005/director :Peter Herz) production designer
Aqua (2005/director: Dávid Spáh) – production designer
Being Julia (2004/director: István Szabó) – assistant production designer
The Sky Wants More (2004/director: Peter Herz) – production designer
Amen (2004/director: Dávid Spáh) – production designer
This Is Love (2004) –production designer
T?ick (2004) – art director
Evergreen (2003/director: Patricia Radoi) – production designer
Limit (2003) – art director
Sense (2002) – production designer
The Girls Are Angels (2000) – art director
Frozen (1999) – art director
The Something (1999) – art director
Without With (1998) – production designer

Theatre projects 
 Children Of Paradise 2021/director: Attila Vidnyánszky Jr.) - production designer
 The Big Gatsby 2019/director: Attila Vidnyánszky Jr.) - production designer
 Gloria (2019/director: Szabolcs Hajdu) - production designer 
 Axe To The Head (2018/director: Illés Horváth) – production designer
 The Idiot (2018/director: Attila Vidnyánszky Jr.) – production designer
 Mighty Aphrodite (2018/director: Péter Valló)– production designer
 Adam's Apples (2017/director: Rémusz Szikszai) – production designer
 Love's Labour's Lost (2017/director: Péter Rudolf)– production designer
 Winter Tale (2017/director: Péter Valló) – production designer
 The Audience (2016/director: Péter Valló) – production designer
 Ivan The Terrible (2016/director: Attila Vidnyánszky Jr.)– production designer
 The Beauty Queen Of Leenane (2015/director: Attila Gigor) – production designer
 Without Veil (2014/director: Áron Mátyássy) – production designer
 Mr. & Mrs. (2011/directors: Viktor Nagy,Zoltán Megyeri,Gergely Fonyó) – production designer
 The Monumental Audience / alternative ensemble (1993–1997)
 Almost Nothing – writer / director
 Bad Habits – writer / director
 Front – writer / director
 Jacque Or The Submission / director

Awards
2022 - 1st Vera Venczel Award - best production designer in 2022
2016 – 22nd Chlotrudis Award / Society for Independent Film – best production design for ’The Duke of Burgundy’
2010 – 20th FanCine International Filmfestival Malaga – best director for ’1’
2010 – 5th CineFantasy Brazil – best sci-fi feature award for ’1’
2010 – 7th Fresh Film Fest Praha – audience award for ’1’
2010 – 30th Fantasporto International Filmfestival – best director for ’1’
2010 – Hungarian Film Critics Awards – best visual design for ’1’
2009 – XVI. Granada International Film Festival – audience award for ’1’
2009 – 40th Hungarian Film Week – best visual design for ’1’
2009 – 40th Hungarian Film Week  / student jury – best debut feature for ’1’
2009 – 10th Golden Blade Creative Festival – Silver Heart Award for a social advertisement
2006 – 37th Hungarian Film Week  – special mention for Recycled/Pro-Reo-Neo
1998 – 30th Budapest Independent Film Festival – 3rd prize for Without With

External links
The Internet Movie Database
End And End Image
1 on Facebook

1978 births
Living people
Hungarian film directors
Alumni of the London Film School